The  is a national expressway in the Chūgoku region of Japan. It is owned and operated by West Nippon Expressway Company.

Overview
The expressway is officially referred to as the Chūgoku-Ōdan Expressway Okayama Yonago Route.

The route connects the city of Yonago with the Chūgoku Expressway in Okayama Prefecture. From the terminus at Yonago Interchange, there are plans to extend the route northward to the terminus of the city of Sakaiminato.

The first section of the expressway was opened to traffic in 1989 and the entire route was completed in 1992. The route was originally 2 lanes only, one in each direction. However expansion to two lanes in each direction has proceeded gradually over the years. Expansion of the southern half (between Ochiai Junction and Hiruzen Interchange) was completed in 2011.

List of interchanges and features

 IC - interchange, SIC - smart interchange, JCT - junction, SA - service area, PA - parking area, BS - bus stop, TN - tunnel, BR - bridge

External links
 West Nippon Expressway Company

Expressways in Japan
Roads in Okayama Prefecture
Roads in Tottori Prefecture